Ivon Anthony Moore-Brabazon, 3rd Baron Brabazon of Tara,  (born 20 December 1946), is a British Conservative politician.

Early life
Lord Brabazon attended Harrow School. He married Harriet Frances de Courcy Hamilton in 1979, with whom he had a son and a daughter. He has worked in the London Stock Exchange and the freight industry.

Political career

House of Lords
He sat in the House of Lords as a Conservative and from 1984 to 1986 was a House of Lords whip in Margaret Thatcher's government. He then became a Parliamentary Under Secretary of State at the Department of Transport, holding that post until 1989. Lord Brabazon was then made a Minister of State at the Foreign and Commonwealth Office. In early 1990, he returned to the Department of Transport as Minister of State, holding that post until leaving office at the 1992 general election.

House of Lords Act 1999
With the passage of the House of Lords Act 1999, Brabazon along with almost all other hereditary peers lost his automatic right to sit in the House of Lords. He was, however, elected as one of the 90  elected hereditary peers to remain in the House of Lords pending completion of House of Lords reform.

In 2001, he was elected Principal Deputy Chairman of Committees, and as a result resigned the Conservative whip and became a non-affiliated member of the House of Lords. This means that he is not associated with any party or with the Crossbenchers. He was the Chairman of Committees from 2002 to 2012, at which point he retook the Conservative whip.

Lord Brabazon is a Deputy Lieutenant of the Isle of Wight.

Marriage and children
He married Harriet Frances Hamilton, daughter of Mervyn Peter de Courcy Hamilton, on 8 September 1979. They have one son and one daughter:

 Benjamin Ralph Moore-Brabazon (b. 15 March 1983), read economics at Durham University (2002–2005); an investment manager with Brewin Dolphin Married to Molly (née Parish)
 Max George Moore-Brabazon (b. 23 March 2015)
 Felix Theodore Reggie Moore-Brabazon (b. 17 May 2017) 
 Anabel Mary Moore-Brabazon (b. 1985), in-house solicitor at Burberry

References

1946 births
Living people
3
Conservative Party (UK) Baronesses- and Lords-in-Waiting
Deputy Lieutenants of the Isle of Wight
Members of the Privy Council of the United Kingdom
People educated at Harrow School
Ivon
Hereditary peers elected under the House of Lords Act 1999